The 2019 Davidson Wildcats football team represents Davidson College in the 2019 NCAA Division I FCS football season. They are led by second-year head coach Scott Abell and play their home games at Richardson Stadium. They are members of the Pioneer Football League.

Preseason

Preseason coaches' poll
The Pioneer League released their preseason coaches' poll on July 30, 2019. The Wildcats were picked to finish in fifth place.

Preseason All-PFL teams
The Wildcats had five players selected to the preseason all–PFL teams.

Offense

First team

Wesley Dugger – RB

Zion Johnson – OL

Second team

Jorell Story – FB

Ethan Steinbacher – OL

Defense

Second team

Bryce Perry-Martin – DL

Schedule

Source:

Game summaries

Georgetown

Virginia–Lynchburg

West Virginia Wesleyan

at Campbell

at Morehead State

San Diego

at Jacksonville

Marist

Valparaiso

at Butler

at Stetson

at Drake

References

Davidson
Davidson Wildcats football seasons
Davidson Wildcats football